The Eurovision Young Musicians 1990 was the fifth edition of the Eurovision Young Musicians, held at Musikverein in Vienna, Austria on 29 May 1990. Organised by the European Broadcasting Union (EBU) and host broadcaster Österreichischer Rundfunk (ORF), musicians from five countries participated in the televised final. A total of eighteen countries took part in the competition. All participants performed a classical piece of their choice accompanied by the Austrian Radio Symphony Orchestra, conducted by Pinchas Steinberg.  and  made their début at the 1990 contest.

The non-qualified countries were Cyprus, Denmark, Finland, Greece, Ireland, Italy, Norway, Portugal, Spain, Sweden, Switzerland, United Kingdom and Yugoslavia. The semifinal took place between 24 and 25 May.  of the Netherlands won the contest.

Location

The Musikverein (also known as the "Wiener Musikverein") a concert hall in Vienna, Austria, was the host venue for the 1990 edition of the Eurovision Young Musicians. It is the home to the Vienna Philharmonic orchestra.

The "Great Hall" due to its highly regarded acoustics is considered one of the finest concert halls in the world, along with Berlin's Konzerthaus, the Concertgebouw in Amsterdam, and Boston's Symphony Hall. None of these halls was built in the modern era with the application of acoustics science and all share a long, tall, and narrow shoebox shape.

It has 1,744 seats and standing room for 300. The Skandalkonzert of 1913 was given there, and it is the venue for the annual Vienna New Year's Concert.

Format
Gerhard Toetschinger was the host of the 1990 contest. 1988 winner Julian Rachlin performed as the interval act.

Results

Preliminary round
A total of eighteen countries took part in the preliminary round of the 1990 contest, of which five qualified to the televised grand final. The following countries failed to qualify.

  Cyprus

Final 
Niek van Oosterum of the Netherlands won the contest. The placing results of the remaining participants is unknown and never made public by the European Broadcasting Union.

Jury members
The jury members consisted of the following:

 / – Carole Dawn Reinhart
  – Rainer Küchl
  – Václav Neumann (head)
  – Philippe Entremont
  – Günther Breest
  – Brian J. Pollard
  – Charles Medlam

Broadcasting
EBU members from the following countries broadcast the final round. Bulgaria, Romania and Soviet Union broadcast the contest in addition to the competing countries.

See also
 Eurovision Song Contest 1990

References

External links 
 

Eurovision Young Musicians by year
1990 in music
1990 in Austria
Music in Vienna
Music festivals in Austria
Events in Vienna
May 1990 events in Europe